Independent College Dublin is a college in Dublin, Ireland which offers courses at certificate, diploma, degree, and postgraduate levels, along with professional development courses. Independent College Dublin was established in Dublin in 2007.

The college was founded by the Independent News & Media plc group, with facilities on Dawson Street in Dublin city centre.

Undergraduate Courses

School of Business
BA (Hons) in Business Studies<
BA (Hons) in Accounting and Finance
BA (Hons) in Marketing

Postgraduate Courses

School of Law

MA in Dispute Resolution

Professional Law Courses
FE1 Exams Preparatory Course
Honorable Society of King's Inns Entrance Examination Preparatory Course
Certificate in Professional Legal Studies (Legal Executives) Part Time
Diploma in Professional Legal Studies (Legal Executives) Part Time

Diplomas & Certificates
Diploma in Radio & Podcast Production: The Today FM School of Radio
Management Diploma in Data Analytics for Business

References

External links

Law Society of Ireland
Postgrad.ie

Education in Dublin (city)
Universities and colleges in the Republic of Ireland